Cecil Cousley MBE (February 1932 – 12 October 2020) was a politician in Northern Ireland.

Cousley was a farmer living near Ballymoney, and an elder at Drumreagh Presbyterian Church.

Cousley was elected to Ballymoney Borough Council in 1981 for the Democratic Unionist Party (DUP). He was also elected to the Northern Ireland Assembly, 1982 in North Antrim.  He held his council seat at each election until he retired in 2015, regularly placing top in the poll. He served as Mayor of Ballymoney in 1988 – 89, 94 – 95 and 2004 – 05, and as Deputy Mayor in 1991 – 92, 2002–03 and 2006 – 07.

In 2007, several sheep were killed on his land, leading to speculation that the Beast of Ballybogey, a phantom cat, was active; the Police Service of Northern Ireland discounted this theory.

References

1932 births
2020 deaths
Members of Ballymoney Borough Council
Democratic Unionist Party councillors
Mayors of places in Northern Ireland
Northern Ireland MPAs 1982–1986
Farmers from Northern Ireland
People from Ballymoney